Mobile-ITX is the smallest (by 2009) x86 compliant motherboard form factor  presented by VIA Technologies in December, 2009. There are no computer ports on the CPU module and it is necessary to use an I/O carrier board. The design is intended for medical, transportation and military embedded markets.

History

The Mobile-ITX form factor was announced by VIA Technologies at Computex in June, 2007. The design was intended for ultra-mobile computing such as a smartphone or UMPC.

The prototype boards shown to date include a x86-compliant 1 GHz VIA C7-M processor, 256 or 512 megabytes of RAM, a modified version of the VIA CX700 chipset (called the CX700S), an interface for a cellular radio module (demonstration boards contain a CDMA radio), a DC-DC electrical converter, and various connecting interfaces.

At the announcement, an ultra-mobile PC reference design was shown running Windows XP Embedded.

Notes and references

External links
Mobile-ITX Specification

Motherboard form factors
IBM PC compatibles
Mobile computers